Kalle-Antti Suominen (born 1964) is a Finnish physicist, professor of physics in the department of physics of University of Turku in Finland, vice-rector for research at the University of Turku, and chair of the physics and astronomy section of the Finnish Academy of Science and Letters.

References

External links
Home page

1964 births
Living people
21st-century Finnish physicists
Academic staff of the University of Turku